Camden station, also known as the Seaboard Air Line Railroad Depot, is a train station in Camden, South Carolina. It serves Amtrak, the national passenger rail service. The station was built by the Seaboard Air Line Railroad in 1937. It is located on 1100 West DeKalb Street (US 1), although some sources give the address as being at 1060 West DeKalb Street. Either way, it was named to the National Register of Historic Places in 2000. The station is in disrepair, and a renovation project is scheduled to commence in August 2014. The station renovations were completed in early 2016.

References

External links

Camden Amtrak Station (USA Rail Guide -- Train Web)

Railway stations on the National Register of Historic Places in South Carolina
Amtrak stations in South Carolina
Former Seaboard Air Line Railroad stations
Buildings and structures in Kershaw County, South Carolina
Railway stations in the United States opened in 1937
Camden, South Carolina
National Register of Historic Places in Kershaw County, South Carolina
1937 establishments in South Carolina